People who served as the mayor of the Municipality of Adamstown are:

References

Adamstown, Mayors
Mayors of Adamstown